Bharat (occasionally also romanised as Bharath or Bharata) is an Indian given name.

Notable people with the name include:
 Bharata Muni, ancient Indian musicologist, author of the Natyashastra
 Bharath (actor) (born 1983), Indian film actor
 Bharath B. J., Indian music producer, composer and singer
 Bharat Mohan Adhikari (1936–2019), Nepali politician and freedom fighter
 Bharat Anand, American economist
 Bharat Awasthy (born 1938), Indian cricketer
 Bharat Bala, Indian film director, screenwriter and film producer
 Bharat Barot, Indian politician
 Bharat Bhushan (academic), American professor of bio/nanotechnology and biomimetics
 Bharat Bhushan (yogi) (born 1952), Indian yoga guru and author
 Bharat Bhushan Goswami (born 1955), Indian sarangi player
 Bharat Bhalke (died 2020), Indian politician
 Bharat Bhushan Ashu (born 1971), Indian politician
 Bharat Goenka, Indian industrialist
 Bharat Boghara, Indian politician and cotton producer
 Bharat B. Chattoo (1951–2016), scientist
 Bharat Chawda (born 1978), Indian television actor
 Bharat Chhikara (born 1985), Indian field hockey player
 Bharat Chipli (born 1983), Indian cricketer
 Bharat Singh Chowhan, Indian politician
 Bharat Desai (born 1952), American businessman
 Bharat Desai (cricketer), Indian cricketer
 Bharat Ganeshpure (born 1969), Marathi comedian
 Bharat Gopy (Kodiyettem Gopy, 1937–2008), Indian film actor, producer and director
 Bharat Gupt (born 1946), Indian professor of English, classicist and musicologist
 Bharat Gurung, Nepali aide-de-camp
 Bharat Kamat (born 1967), Hindustani classical tabla player
 Bharat Karnad, national security expert
 Bharat Kaul, Indian actor
 Bharat Khanna (1914–1993), Indian cricketer
 Bharat Khawas (born 1992), Nepali footballer
 Bharat Khorani, Indian politician
 Bharat Masrani, Canadian banker
 Bharat Ram Meghwal (born 1956), Indian politician
 Bharat Nalluri (born 1965), British-Indian film and television director
 Bharat Narah, Indian politician
 Bharat Pandya, Indian politician
 Bharat Patankar, Indian activist
 Bharat Patel (born 1952), Zimbabwean judge
 Bharat Popli (born 1990), Indian-born New Zealand cricketer
 Bharat Ram (1914–2007), Indian industrialist
 Bharat Ramamurti, American attorney and political advisor
 Bharat Rangachary Indian film director and producer of Bollywood
 Bharat Ratra (born 1960), Indian-American physicist
 Bharat Singh Rawat, Indian politician
 Bharat Sawad (1968–?), Nepalese weightlifter
 Bharat Shah (cricketer) (1945–2016), Indian cricketer
 Bharat Shah (born 1944), Indian film financier and distributor
 Bharat Kumar Shah, Nepalese politician
 Bharath Shetty Y (born 1971), Indian politician
 Bharat Singh, Indian politician
 Bharat Sitaula, Nepali pop singer-songwriter and record producer
 Bharat Sundar (born 1988), Indian Carnatic singer
 Bharat Swamy, Indian rock musician
 Bharat Tripathi (born 1989), English cricketer
 Bharat Bhushan Tyagi (born 1954), Indian farmer and educator
 Bharat Raj Upreti (1950–2015), justice of the Supreme Court of Nepal
 Bharat Vatwani, Indian psychiatrist
 Bharat Veer (born 1988), Indian cricketer
 Bharat Vyas (1918–1983), Indian lyricist for Hindi films
 Bharat Vir Wanchoo, Indian politician

See also 
 
 
 Bharathan (1946–1998), Indian film maker

Indian masculine given names